Tides is the fourth full-length studio album by English electronic musician Phaeleh. It was released in July 2013 by Afterglo Records.

Track listing

Chart performance

References

External links
Tides on iTunes.com
Tides on Spotify

2013 albums
Phaeleh albums